Myosin-11 is a protein that in humans is encoded by the MYH11 gene.

Function 

Myosin-11 is a smooth muscle myosin belonging to the myosin heavy chain family. Myosin-11 is a subunit of a hexameric protein that consists of two heavy chain subunits and two pairs of non-identical light chain subunits.

It is a major contractile protein, converting chemical energy into mechanical energy through the hydrolysis of ATP.

Alternative splicing generates isoforms that are differentially expressed, with ratios changing during muscle cell maturation.

Clinical significance 

Thoracic aortic aneurysms leading to acute aortic dissections (TAAD) can be inherited in isolation or in association with genetic syndromes, such as Marfan syndrome and Loeys-Dietz syndrome. When TAAD occurs in the absence of syndromic features, it is inherited in an autosomal dominant manner with decreased penetrance and variable expression, the disease is referred to as familial TAAD.  Familial TAAD exhibits significant clinical and genetic heterogeneity.  Mutations in MYH11 have been described in individuals with TAAD with patent ductus arteriosus (PDA).  Of individuals with TAAD, approximately 4% have mutations in TGFBR2, and approximately 1-2% have mutations in either TGFBR1 or MYH11.  In addition, FBN1 mutations have also been reported in individuals with TAAD.  Mutations within the SMAD3 gene have recently been reported in patients with a syndromic form of aortic aneurysms and dissections with early onset osteoarthritis.  SMAD3 mutations are thought to account for approximately 2% of familial TAAD.  Additionally, mutations in the ACTA2 gene are thought to account for approximately 10-14% of familial TAAD.

Acute myeloid leukemia

The gene encoding a human ortholog of rat NUDE1 is transcribed from the reverse strand of this gene, and its 3' end overlaps with that of the latter. The pericentric inversion of chromosome 16 [inv(16)(p13q22)] produces a chimeric transcript that encodes a protein consisting of the first 165 residues from the N-terminus of core-binding factor beta in a fusion with the C-terminal portion of the smooth muscle myosin heavy chain. This chromosomal rearrangement is associated with acute myeloid leukemia of the M4Eo subtype.

Intestinal cancer 

MYH11 mutations appear to contribute to human intestinal cancer.

References

External links
  GeneReviews/NIH/NCBI/UW entry on Thoracic Aortic Aneurysms and Aortic Dissections

Further reading